The Aufbau Vereinigung (Reconstruction Organisation) was a Munich-based counterrevolutionary conspiratorial group formed in the aftermath of the German occupation of Ukraine in 1918 and of the Latvian Intervention of 1919. It brought together White Russian émigrés and early German Nazis who aimed to overthrow the governments of Germany and the Soviet Union, replacing them with authoritarian régimes of the far right. The group was originally known as Die Bruecke (The Bridge). Aufbau was also the name of a periodical it brought out. 

The Aufbau (Economic-Political Society for Aid to the East) was founded in 1921 by General Vasily Biskupsky and the political writer Max von Scheubner-Richter. The future top Nazi functionaries Alfred Rosenberg and Arno Schickedanz would serve for a time in the office of the organisation. According to Michael Kellogg, the Aufbau Vereinigung was a vital influence on the development of Nazi ideology in the years before the Beer Hall Putsch of 1923 as well as financing the NSDAP with, for example, funds from Henry Ford. It gave Hitler the idea of a vast Jewish conspiracy, involving a close alliance between international finance and Bolshevism and threatening disaster for mankind. Recent research on Hitler's early years in Vienna (1905-1913) appears to have shown that his antisemitism was at that time far less developed than it became under the new influences.

Aufbau members became involved in terrorist activities, including the assassinations of German Foreign Minister Walther Rathenau and Russian émigré Vladimir Dmitrievich Nabokov (both in 1922).

After the death of Scheubner-Richter in the putsch, Aufbau rapidly declined, and notions of Lebensraum and Slavic inferiority, naturally unpopular with the Russians, gained a stronger hold on the Nazi movement. 

The long-term influence of Aufbau has been traced in the implementation of the final solution and in Hitler's disastrous decision to divert troops away from Moscow towards Ukraine in 1941.

Prominent members of Aufbau included:
Max Erwin von Scheubner-Richter (a Baltic German from the Russian Empire)
Alfred Rosenberg (a Baltic German from the Russian Empire)
Fyodor Vinberg (Russian officer)
Piotr Shabelsky-Bork (Russian officer)
General Vasily Biskupsky (Russian officer)
Erich Ludendorff
Max Amann
Boris Brasol (Russian émigré)

References

External links
 https://web.archive.org/web/20100615191931/http://ils.unc.edu/mpact/mpact.php?op=show_tree&id=7004

Anti-communist organizations
Early Nazism (–1933)
Russian Civil War
Counter-revolutionaries